The 28th Street Metro Cruise, commonly known as the Metro Cruise, is an annual auto show and car cruise event held on 28th Street in Wyoming, Grand Rapids and Kentwood, Michigan, typically occurring one week after the Woodward Dream Cruise. Participants often cruise in their vehicles down 28th Street, driving  between Grandville and Cascade Township and participating in events occurring in the corridor.

Background 

Cruising down 28th Street near Rogers Plaza in Wyoming was a common pastime for car enthusiasts in the late 20th century when the street was the main retail corridor from the 1960s until the 1990s. In 1999 when Rivertown Crossings Mall opened in Grandville near the southwest border of Wyoming, many commercial tenants left the 28th Street corridor. Following the opening of the M-6 highway in late-2004, the Wyoming-Kentwood Area Chamber of Commerce planned the first Metro Cruise to be held in August 2005 in an initiative to bring business to 28th Street.

History 

The first Metro Cruise in 2005 experienced 85,000 visitors and 15,000 vehicles participating in one day. In 2007, the cruise was expanded to two days of events and the prohibition of burnouts was strictly enforced following the Selmer, Tennessee burnout tragedy, when 6 were killed and 20 injured after a funny car crashed into a crowd during a burnout. In 2015, a locally-restored GM Futurliner participated in the cruise and was added to the National Historic Vehicle Register. By 2019, between 250,000 and 275,000 people visited the Metro Cruise. In 2020, the Metro Cruise was cancelled due to the COVID-19 pandemic in the United States. The cruise would return the following year in 2021, producing an estimated $7 million for the local economy that week.

Events 

The main event sites for the Metro Cruise are two shopping malls; Rogers Plaza and Woodland Mall. The majority of events are free and include classic automobile shows, concerts, dynamometer testing, food concessions and the Miss Metro Cruise pin-up girl contest.

See also 

 Back to the Bricks
 Cruisin' Downriver

References 

Auto shows in the United States
Automotive events
Michigan culture
Grand Rapids, Michigan
Recurring events established in 2005
2005 establishments in Michigan
Tourist attractions in Kent County, Michigan